Stijn Haeldermans (born 22 April 1975 in Hasselt) is a Belgian former professional football player. He was wearing the shirts of inter alia KRC Genk, Standard Liège and the German 2. Bundesliga club Rot-Weiss Essen.

Since retiring from professional football, Stijn Haeldermans has founded and is the CEO of Kirola Sports (www.kirolasports.com), that offers sports marketing and representation services to sports persons, especially for the protection and commercialisation of their valuable international image rights.

Also, in 2013, he has been awarded by the University of Maastricht an LL.M. in Globalisation and Law (with specialisation in corporate and commercial law).

References 

1975 births
Living people
Belgian footballers
Association football midfielders
MVV Maastricht players
Standard Liège players
K.R.C. Genk players
Lierse S.K. players
Fortuna Sittard players
Rot-Weiss Essen players
Rot-Weiß Oberhausen players
2. Bundesliga players
Expatriate footballers in Germany
Sportspeople from Hasselt
Footballers from Limburg (Belgium)
20th-century Belgian people